Jeff Olson (born January 16, 1966, in Bozeman, Montana) is an American former alpine skier who competed in the 1988 Winter Olympics and 1992 Winter Olympics.

References

External links

1966 births
Living people
American male alpine skiers
Olympic alpine skiers of the United States
Alpine skiers at the 1988 Winter Olympics
Alpine skiers at the 1992 Winter Olympics
Sportspeople from Bozeman, Montana